An American Tail: Fievel Goes West (Music from the Motion Picture Soundtrack) is the soundtrack and score album to the 1991 film An American Tail: Fievel Goes West. The animated Western comedy film, which was the first to be produced by Amblimation, an animation studio and subsidiary of Steven Spielberg's Amblin Entertainment, is the sequel to An American Tail (1986). 
James Horner who composed music for the first film, returned to score for Fievel Goes West, and in addition, also wrote four original songs with Will Jennings. 
The album featured four songs, with Linda Ronstadt and Cathy Cavadini performing the tracks. The original song "Dreams to Dream" received a nomination for Golden Globe Award for Best Original Song, and was shortlisted for the nomination of Academy Award for Best Original Song. However the track was not nominated.

Background 
The album featured four songs: two versions of "Dreams to Dream", "Way Out West" performed by a chorus, and "The Girl You Left Behind" performed by Cathy Cavadini. The film also features the cover of "Rawhide" from the Blues Brothers 1980 film. Songs and themes from the first film: "Somewhere Out There", "Mouses Even Cry", "If Cheese Grew on Trees", "Anything Can Happen in America" and "Fievel's Point of View" were also played in the film, though not included in the soundtrack.

"Dreams to Dream" is based on the short instrumental piece from the first film. On July 19, 1991, the Los Angeles Daily News announced Anita Baker would sing "Dreams to Dream", but this did not happen. Although Linda Ronstadt originally sang the song, she rejected allowing her voice on it after recording finished; Celine Dion was replaced, and she recorded her vocals while working on her second English-language album. However, Ronstadt then asked for her vocals to be on the track, and the executives thought Dion did not have enough star power. While this resulted in the re-insertion of Ronstadt's voice, Horner's experience with recording the song with Dion led her to singing on a later Horner-composed song, "My Heart Will Go On". Cavadini also sang Tanya's version of "Dreams to Dream".

The score was recorded at the London Symphony Orchestra and several instruments were used in the score, including xylophones, fiddles, banjos, harmonicas, and array of wood and metal percussion.

Release history 
MCA Records released An American Tail: Fievel Goes West (Music from the Motion Picture Soundtrack) on November 12, 1991 in cassettes, CDs and LP record. The album was released in United States, United Kingdom, Canada, Germany, Austria, Brazil, Indonesia, Malaysia and Japan under the catalog number 10416. In 2013, Geffen Records re-released the soundtrack for digital streaming services.

Reception 
An Entertainment Weekly review compared the score to the soundtracks of Gunsmoke and Oklahoma! (1955) as well as the works of Aaron Copland. Filmtracks said that the songs "play a lesser role in the success of this overall package than in the first one", but called Horner's score as "no less than fantastic". It further added, "The highlights of the full ensemble performances are the several cues in which Horner blatantly pulls Copland's rodeo music, ambitious string and light percussion rhythms with brass motifs that frankly could have resulted in a lawsuit." AllMusic called the soundtrack as "surely be a favorite among young audiences". RogerEbert.com called the score as "one of the underrated works of James Horner".

Commercial performance 
In the United States, Ronstadt's version of "Dreams to Dream" reached number 13 on Billboards Adult Contemporary chart and number eight on Cashboxs Looking Ahead chart. It also reached 69 on RPMs Canadian singles chart and 18 on the magazine's Adult Contemporary chart.

Track listing

References 

1991 soundtrack albums
MCA Records soundtracks
An American Tail (franchise)
James Horner albums
Animated film soundtracks